Port Norfolk Historic District is a national historic district located at Portsmouth, Virginia. It encompasses 621 contributing buildings and 1 contributing site in a primarily residential section of suburban Portsmouth.  It was developed between about 1890 and 1910, and includes notable examples of Queen Anne, Bungalow / American Craftsman, and American Foursquare style single family residences.

It was listed on the National Register of Historic Places in 1983.

References

Historic districts on the National Register of Historic Places in Virginia
Queen Anne architecture in Virginia
Buildings and structures in Portsmouth, Virginia
National Register of Historic Places in Portsmouth, Virginia